Hopewell is a settlement in Christ Church Parish, Barbados.

References

Populated places in Barbados

gu:હોપવેલ્, ક્રાઇસ્ટ ચર્ચ